Tibor Bedekovits (born 24 September 1930) is a Hungarian rower. He competed at the 1960 Summer Olympics in Rome with the men's coxed four where they came sixth.

References

External links

1930 births
Possibly living people
Hungarian male rowers
Olympic rowers of Hungary
Rowers at the 1960 Summer Olympics
People from Baja, Hungary
European Rowing Championships medalists
Sportspeople from Bács-Kiskun County